Araeomolis haematoneura is a moth of the family Erebidae. It was described by entomologists James John Joicey and George Talbot in 1916. It is found in Colombia.

References

Phaegopterina
Moths described in 1916
Moths of South America